Amalda benthicola is a species of sea snail, a marine gastropod mollusk in the family Ancillariidae.

Description
Amalda benthicola is a small mollusk. They were first discovered by R. K. Dell in 1956.

Distribution

References

bellonarum
Gastropods described in 1956